Dongfeng is a town of Chao'an County in eastern Guangdong province, China, on the southern (right) bank of the lower reaches of the Han River. , it has 1 residential community and 34 villages under its administration.

See also 
 List of township-level divisions of Guangdong

References 

Towns in Guangdong
Chaozhou